Nepenthes hirsuta (from Latin: hirsūtus "hairy, bristly"), the hairy pitcher-plant, is a tropical pitcher plant endemic to Borneo. It is characterised by an indumentum of thick brown hairs, which is even present on the inflorescence.  Pitchers are mostly green throughout with some having red blotches on the inside surfaces.

N. hirsuta grows at an elevation of 200–1100 m. It is present in a wide range of habitats, including kerangas forest, mossy banks in lower montane forest, open areas, and disturbed vegetation on lower ridges. It grows mostly on sandstone substrates.

Taxonomy

N. hirsuta is most closely related to N. hispida and N. macrovulgaris. Botanists Matthew Jebb and Martin Cheek suggest that N. hirsuta is also related to N. philippinensis, a species endemic to Palawan in the Philippines.

In his Carnivorous Plant Database, taxonomist Jan Schlauer treats N. hispida as a heterotypic synonym of N. hirsuta.

Infraspecific taxa

Nepenthes hirsuta var. glabrata Macfarl. (1908)
Nepenthes hirsuta var. glabrescens W.G.Sm. (1882) [=N. distillatoria]
Nepenthes hirsuta var. glabrescens rubra auct. non Hort. ex Rafarin: Nichols. (1892) [=N. distillatoria]
Nepenthes hirsuta var. typica Macfarl. (1908) nom.illeg.

Natural hybrids

The following natural hybrids involving N. hirsuta have been recorded.

N. albomarginata × N. hirsuta
N. ampullaria × N. hirsuta
? N. hirsuta × N. lowii

References

Further reading

 Adam, J.H., C.C. Wilcock & M.D. Swaine 1992.  Journal of Tropical Forest Science 5(1): 13–25.
 Adam, J.H. & C.C. Wilcock 1999.  Pertanika Journal of Tropical Agricultural Science 22(1): 1–7.
 Bauer, U., C.J. Clemente, T. Renner & W. Federle 2012. Form follows function: morphological diversification and alternative trapping strategies in carnivorous Nepenthes pitcher plants. Journal of Evolutionary Biology 25(1): 90–102. 
 Bourke, G. 2010.  Captive Exotics Newsletter 1(1): 4–7. 
 Bourke, G. 2010.  Captive Exotics Newsletter 1(3): 10. 
 Bourke, G. 2011. The Nepenthes of Mulu National Park. Carniflora Australis 8(1): 20–31.
 Burbidge, F.W. 1882. Notes on the new Nepenthes. The Gardeners' Chronicle, new series, 17(420): 56.
 Clarke, C.M. 2006. Introduction. In: Danser, B.H. The Nepenthaceae of the Netherlands Indies. Natural History Publications (Borneo), Kota Kinabalu. pp. 1–15.
 Lee, C.C. 2000. Recent Nepenthes Discoveries. [video] The 3rd Conference of the International Carnivorous Plant Society, San Francisco, USA.
 Lee, C.C. 2002.  Proceedings of the 4th International Carnivorous Plant Conference, Hiroshima University, Tokyo: 25–30.
 Lee, C.C. 2002. Nepenthes species of the Hose Mountains in Sarawak, Borneo. [video] The 4th International Carnivorous Plant Conference, Tokyo, Japan. (video by Irmgard & Siegfried R. H. Hartmeyer)
  Mansur, M. 2001.  In: Prosiding Seminar Hari Cinta Puspa dan Satwa Nasional. Lembaga Ilmu Pengetahuan Indonesia, Bogor. pp. 244–253.
  Mansur, M. 2007. Keanekaragaman jenis Nepenthes (kantong semar) dataran rendah di Kalimantan Tengah. [Diversity of lowland Nepenthes (kantong semar) in Central Kalimantan.] Berita Biologi 8(5): 335–341. Abstract
 Mansur, M. & F.Q. Brearley 2008. Ecological studies on Nepenthes at Barito Ulu, Central Kalimantan, Indonesia. Jurnal Teknologi Lingkungan 9(3): 271–276.
 McPherson, S.R. & A. Robinson 2012. Field Guide to the Pitcher Plants of Borneo. Redfern Natural History Productions, Poole.
 Meimberg, H., A. Wistuba, P. Dittrich & G. Heubl 2001. Molecular phylogeny of Nepenthaceae based on cladistic analysis of plastid trnK intron sequence data. Plant Biology 3(2): 164–175. 
  Meimberg, H. 2002.  Ph.D. thesis, Ludwig Maximilian University of Munich, Munich.
 Meimberg, H. & G. Heubl 2006. Introduction of a nuclear marker for phylogenetic analysis of Nepenthaceae. Plant Biology 8(6): 831–840. 
 Meimberg, H., S. Thalhammer, A. Brachmann & G. Heubl 2006. Comparative analysis of a translocated copy of the trnK intron in carnivorous family Nepenthaceae. Molecular Phylogenetics and Evolution 39(2): 478–490. 
 Renner, T. & C.D. Specht 2011. A sticky situation: assessing adaptations for plant carnivory in the Caryophyllales by means of stochastic character mapping. International Journal of Plant Sciences 172(7): 889–901. 
 Russell, C. & E. Ossian 1990. Opportunistic feeding involving the pitcher plants Nepenthes hirsuta, Nepenthes gracilis and the epiphytic orchid Schomburgkia tibicinis, or natural ant eradication, the rube goldberg method. The Orchid Digest 54(4): 182–184.
 Steiner, H. 2002. Borneo: Its Mountains and Lowlands with their Pitcher Plants. Toihaan Publishing Company, Kota Kinabalu. viii + 136 pp.
 Thorogood, C. 2010. The Malaysian Nepenthes: Evolutionary and Taxonomic Perspectives. Nova Science Publishers, New York.

Carnivorous plants of Asia
hirsuta
Endemic flora of Borneo
Plants described in 1873